Allure is a 2014 independent feature film written, directed and edited by Vladan Nikolic. It is based on true stories.  Filmmakers and performers - actors and non-actors - worked together to flesh out the story and protagonists. All scenes and dialogue in the film were improvised.

Some scenes were shot with actors participating in the actual Occupy Wall Street protests of 2011 and 2012. The film premiered at the 2014 Black Nights film festival in Tallinn, Estonia, where it was nominated for best North American Independent feature film, and had a limited release in the US in March 2015, followed by on video-on-demand and online streaming in the Fall of 2015.

Plot
Billed as an "experiment in situationist cinema," the film focuses on five women in New York, who have come from different countries and settings. Each one struggles to overcome her personal conflict, set against the Occupy Wall Street movements of 2011. These separate, but intersecting multi-ethnic storylines touch and inform each other, and create a larger narrative about gender, emigration, power, class, and personal politics. The film also references some ideas of The Society of the Spectacle by Guy Debord through contemporary stories.

Cast
 Madeleine Assas as Valerie
 Didier Flamand as Jean
 Caveh Zahedi as The Professor
 Diana Lotus as Liliana
 Ying Ying Li as Jin
 Julia Konrad Viezzer as Marta
 Aisha de Bankole as Kasoke

Production
The film was produced in an unusual and experimental way, on almost no budget. Filmmakers and actors formed a co-op, shooting non-consecutively in New York City over several months in the summer and fall of 2012.

Critical reception
The film opened to positive or mixed reviews. Jeannette Catsoulis in The New York Times wrote: "Mr. Nikolic, who teaches film at the New School, draws lovely performances from his cosmopolitan cast and oodles of atmosphere." Frank Scheck of The Hollywood Reporter remarked that, while the film boasts "striking black-and-white, widescreen cinematography by Aleksandar Kostic and strong performances by its ethnically diverse ensemble, Allure never quite coheres into a dramatically arresting whole," while Michael Nordine of The Village Voice commented that "Allure tries to make sense of the Occupy Movement."

See also
 List of French-language films
 List of Mandarin-language films

References

External links

 
 
 
 
 "Allure on VHX".vhx.tv.
 "Allure on MSN Entertainment". msn.com.

2014 films
2014 independent films
American independent films
2010s English-language films
2010s Spanish-language films
2010s French-language films
Chinese-language films
American black-and-white films
Films set in New York City
Films shot in New York (state)
American political films
2010s political films
2014 multilingual films
American multilingual films
2010s American films